The Altai mole or Siberian mole (Talpa altaica) is a species of mole in the family Talpidae. It is found throughout the taiga zone of south-central Siberia in Russia, as far south as northern Mongolia and Kazakhstan.

This mole lives in forested habitat and feeds mainly on earthworms.

This is a common species. It is sometimes caught for its fur.

References

Talpa
Mammals of Russia
Mammals of Mongolia
Fauna of Kazakhstan
Mammals of Siberia
Taxonomy articles created by Polbot
Mammals described in 1883